The Joplin Globe is a seven-day digital edition and five-day print edition daily newspaper published in Joplin, Missouri, United States, covering parts of 14 counties in southwestern Missouri. Ottaway Community Newspapers owned the Globe from 1975 to 2002. Since 2002, it has been owned by Community Newspaper Holdings Inc.

The first issue of The Globe was published on August 9, 1896. Its marketing slogan is "It's your world. We deliver it." In 2012, The Globe was named “Newspaper of the Year” by the Local Media Association.

Bonnie and Clyde scoop
In 1933, The Joplin Globe had a country-wide scoop, obtaining the camera left behind by Bonnie and Clyde after a deadly confrontation with local police, developing and publishing the rolls of film in it, including the now-legendary photos of Bonnie Parker holding Clyde Barrow at mock gunpoint and of Bonnie with her foot on a fender, pistol in her hand, and cigar in her mouth.

Founder
Gilbert Barbee was born in 1850 in Ritchey, Newton County, Missouri. Barbee made his fortune in lead mining and owned the Joplin Globe from 1899 to 1911. He later established and published the Joplin Tribune.  Barbee was an active member of the Democratic Party and he owned the Barbee Park racetrack and the House of Lords pub.  Barbee also donated money and land to build the Children's Home, an orphanage in Joplin. He died in 1924 in Joplin, Jasper County, Missouri.

References

External links 
 Joplin Globe Website
 CNHI Website
 Gilbert Barbee gravesite

Newspapers published in Missouri
Joplin, Missouri
Publications established in 1896
1896 establishments in Missouri